Shinwar is a district in Nangarhar Province, Afghanistan. It is on the main highway from Jalalabad to the Torkham border crossing. Its population, which is 100% Pashtun, was estimated at 40,147 in 2002, of whom 16,000 were children under 12. The district is within the heartland of the Shinwari tribe of Pashtuns. The district centre is the village of Shinwar.

History
In March 2007, Shinwar was the site of the Shinwar massacre.

Climate
Shinwar has a humid continental climate (Köppen climate classification Dfa), with hot summers and cold winters. January is the coldest month, with temperatures averaging .

See also
Shinwari District in Parwan Province

References

 UNHCR District Profile, dated 2002-05-19, accessed 2006-07-25 (PDF).

External links
 Map of Shinwar district (PDF)

Districts of Nangarhar Province